Richard Penn Smith (March 13, 1799 - August 12, 1854) was a minor American playwright who is best known for writing a largely fictitious account of events at and leading up to the Battle of the Alamo, which was presented as the work of Davy Crockett.

Life and career
Smith was born in Philadelphia. His father was William Moore Smith (1759–1821) and his grandfather William Smith had been the first provost of the College of Philadelphia. In 1818 he began his legal studies in the law offices of William Rawle. During that time, he began writing a column called "The Plagiarist" for a local newspaper. This prompted him to purchase a small newspaper named The Aurora which he edited from 1822-1827. The next year his first play, "Quite Correct", was produced at the Chestnut Street Theater. That same year, he sold The Aurora and returned to legal practice to support his theatrical work. He had written over thirteen plays by 1836, when he stopped writing following the publication of "Davy Crockett's Journal". He was married twice and had 5 children with each wife. Only 1 survived from the first marriage, but all 5 from the second remained alive. He died at his home in Philadelphia in 1854. He was initially interred in a mausoleum on his estate but was reinterred along with 14 family members to a plot at Laurel Hill Cemetery.

Historical Hoax

In 1836, a sensation was created by a new book titled "Col. Crockett's Exploits and Adventures in Texas: wherein is contained a full account of his journey from Tennessee to the Red River and Natchitoches, and thence across Texas to San Antonio; including many hair-breadth escapes; together with a topographical, historical, and political view of Texas ... Written by Himself". It was published by "T.K. and P.G. Collins" (actually Carey and Hart, who had published some of Crockett's authentic, though heavily edited, writings). They falsely claimed that it was Crockett’s journal, which had been taken from the Alamo by Mexican General Manuel Fernández Castrillón and later recovered at the Battle of San Jacinto, where the General was killed. It became a huge best-seller. For over a century the book had a profound influence on the public's view of the Texas Revolution and Davy Crockett's career, despite the fact that the author's true identity had been revealed in 1884.

List of Plays

Reasonably popular at the time, modern criticism has judged Smith to be a competent craftsman of little originality, as most of his plays were based on earlier works. He was considered to be part of the "Philadelphia School" of dramatists.

 Quite Correct (1828)
 The Eighth of January (1829)
 The Disowned: or The Prodigals (1829)
 A Wife at a Venture (1829)
 The Sentinels: or The Two Sergeants (1829)
 William Penn (1829)
 The Triumph at Plattsburgh (1830)
 The Deformed: or Woman's Trial (1830) (based on The Honest Whore, Part II (c. 1606) and The Italian Father (1799))
 The Water-Witch (1830)
 Caius Marius (1831) 
 Is She a Brigand? (1833)
 The Daughter (1836)
 The Actress of Padua (1836)
 The Bombardment of Algiers (?)
 The Last Man: or The Cock of the Village (?)

References

1854 deaths
1799 births
19th-century American dramatists and playwrights
Burials at Laurel Hill Cemetery (Philadelphia)